Hotel LaFontaine is a historic hotel building located at Huntington, Huntington County, Indiana.   It was built in 1925, and consists of a six-story central pavilion with five-story flanking wings.  It is of steel frame and hollow-tile construction and sheathed in brick.  The building is in the Colonial Revival style.  The lobby is designed to resemble a Spanish courtyard and the basement houses an Egyptian inspired swimming pool that opened in 1927. The hotel is named for Francis La Fontaine.  It housed a hotel until 1974.

It was listed on the National Register of Historic Places in 1984. It is located in the Huntington Courthouse Square Historic District.

References

Hotel buildings on the National Register of Historic Places in Indiana
Colonial Revival architecture in Indiana
Hotel buildings completed in 1925
Buildings and structures in Huntington County, Indiana
National Register of Historic Places in Huntington County, Indiana
Historic district contributing properties in Indiana